Puthiya Mugam() is an upcoming Tamil-language thriller film directed by Sriram Dhanabalakrishnan in their directorial debut and starring Kalaiyarasan and Arundhati. The film has a musical score by Achu Rajamani.

Cast
 Kalaiyarasan
 Arundhati
 R.K. Suresh
 Jagan
 Mime Gopi

Production
After the stupendous success of Adhe Kangal, Kalaiyarasan signed Puthiya Mugam with debutant director Sriram. In April 2018, production was wrapped up The film also features Arundathi as the lead actress and R.K. Suresh, Mime Gopi, and Jagan in supporting roles.

Achu was hired as the music director for the film. His song "Oh Baby Girl" from Maalai Pozhudhin Mayakathilaey (2012) was reworked for the film.

References

Upcoming films
Indian thriller films
Upcoming Tamil-language films